Beach volleyball at the 2017 Pacific Mini Games in Port Vila, Vanuatu is held at the Korman beach volleyball courts from the 11–15 December.

Nations participating
Fourteen nations will participate in beach volleyball at the 2017 games.

Men

Women

Medal summary

Medal table

Medalists

Men's tournament

Preliminary round
Twelve teams consisting of three pools of four will be competing for six spots in the knockout stage. According to statistics from the preliminary stage, the top two teams will advance directly into the semis with the remaining four teams playing for the remaining two semifinal spots.

Pool A

|}

|}

Pool B

|}

|}

Pool C

|}

|}

Women's tournament

Preliminary round
Nine teams divided into two pools, pool A with five teams and pool B with four, will be competing against each other with the top two in each pool advancing to the semifinals.

Pool A

|}

|}

Pool B

|}

|}

See also
 Beach volleyball at the Pacific Games

References

External links
 Result system
 Match

2017 Pacific Mini Games
2017
Pacific Mini Games